The Bilaspur–Chennai Central Superfast Express is a Superfast Express train belonging to South East Central Railway zone that runs between Bilaspur Junction and Chennai Central in India. It is currently being operated with 12851/12852 train numbers on a weekly basis.

Service
The 12851/Bilaspur-Chennai Central Weekly SF Express has an average speed of 59 km/hr and covers 1415 km in 24h. The 12852/Chennai Central-Bilaspur Weekly SF Express has an average speed of 61 km/hr and covers 1415 km in 23h 5m. People are demanding this train to be extended to Rameswaram so it would be the first train to connect Chhattisgarh to Rameswaram.

Route and halts 

The important halts of the train are:

Coach composite

The train has standard LHB rakes with a maximum speed of 110 kmph. The train consists of 22 coaches:

 1 AC First cum AC Two Tier
 1 AC II Tier
 4 AC III Tier
 1 Pantry Car
 10 Sleeper Coaches
 2 General Unreserved
 2 EOG 
EOG 
GS
GS
S1
S2
S3
S4
S5
S6
S7
S8
S9
S10
PC
B4
B3
B2
B1
A1
HA1
EOG

Traction

From 10 June 2018, Bilaspur chennai S/F express was hauled by an electric locomotive, as Gondia Balharshah section electrification is now completed. WAP-7 Bhilai is a regular link for this train now for both the sides.

Rake Sharing 

The train shares its rake with 12849/12850 Bilaspur - Pune Superfast Express.

Notes

See also 

 Bilaspur Junction railway station
 Chennai Central railway station
 Bilaspur - Pune Superfast Express

References

External links 

 12851/Bilaspur - Chennai Central Weekly SF Express
 12852/Chennai Central - Bilaspur Weekly SF Express

Transport in Bilaspur, Chhattisgarh
Transport in Chennai
Express trains in India
Rail transport in Chhattisgarh
Rail transport in Maharashtra
Rail transport in Telangana
Rail transport in Andhra Pradesh
Rail transport in Tamil Nadu
Railway services introduced in 2006